Robert Broadbent (5 November 1904 – 4 October 1986) was an Australian cyclist. He competed in the 50km event at the 1924 Summer Olympics.

References

External links
 

1904 births
1986 deaths
Australian male cyclists
Olympic cyclists of Australia
Cyclists at the 1924 Summer Olympics
People from Richmond, Victoria
Cyclists from Melbourne